Abrostola microvalis, the minute oval abrostola, is a species of looper moth in the family Noctuidae. It is found in North America.

The MONA or Hodges number for Abrostola microvalis is 8883.

References

Further reading

 
 
 

Plusiinae
Articles created by Qbugbot
Moths described in 1919